The 1990 Peak AntiFreeze 500 was a NASCAR Winston Cup Series racing event that took place on September 16, 1990, at Dover Downs International Speedway in Dover, Delaware.

Phoenix Racing would make their "maiden voyage" into the NASCAR Cup Series; with veteran wheelman Jeff Purvis dominating the decision-making throughout the event. After suffering from a shoulder injury in practice, Lake Speed would be replaced by Tommy Ellis.

Background
Dover Downs International Speedway, now called Dover International Speedway, is one of five short tracks to hold NASCAR races; the others are Bristol Motor Speedway, Richmond International Raceway, Martinsville Speedway, and Phoenix International Raceway. The track's turns are banked at twenty-four degrees, and both the front stretch (the location of the finish line) and the backstretch are banked at nine degrees.

Race report
Bill Elliott managed to defeat Mark Martin (who would maintain the championship points lead after this race) by less than 1.4 seconds in front of 74,000 spectators. J.D. McDuffie would make his final last-place finish before being killed at the 1991 Budweiser at The Glen race (which took place at Watkins Glen International). The only driver that failed to qualify was Kerry Teague.

Six cautions were handed out for 29 laps. The prize winnings for each driver varied from a then-incredible $83,100 ($ when inflation is taken into account) to a meager $2,650 ($ when inflation is taken into account). This would become the last Last ESPN race at Dover until the 2010 NASCAR Sprint Cup Series season.

This was Jimmy Makar's first race as a Winston Cup Crew Chief. He replaced Barry Dodson as Rusty Wallace's CC for the Blue Max team.

Tommy Riggins and Jerry Hufflin would retire from the Winston Cup Series after this race.  Bobby Wawak would also make his NASCAR exit as an owner after this racing event.

Qualifying

Top 10 finishers

Timeline
Section reference: 
 Start of race: Bill Elliott had the pole position as the green flag was waved.
 Lap 44: Dale Earnhardt took over the lead from Bill Elliott.
 Lap 54: Bill Elliott took over the lead from Dale Earnhardt.
 Lap 63: Dale Earnhardt took over the lead from Bill Elliott.
 Lap 87: Bill Elliott took over the lead from Dale Earnhardt.
 Lap 89: Geoffrey Bodine took over the lead from Bill Elliott.
 Lap 91: Harry Gant took over the lead from Geoffrey Bodine.
 Lap 92: Dale Earnhardt took over the lead from Harry Gant.
 Lap 153: Bill Elliott took over the lead from Dale Earnhardt.
 Lap 314: Dale Earnhardt took over the lead from Bill Elliott.
 Lap 321: Mark Martin took over the lead from Dale Earnhardt.
 Lap 352: Bill Elliott took over the lead from Mark Martin.
 Finish: Bill Elliott was officially declared the winner of the event.

Standings after the race

References

Peak AntiFreeze 500
Peak AntiFreeze 500
NASCAR races at Dover Motor Speedway